Tanyard is an unincorporated community in Caroline County, Maryland, United States.

History
As far back as 1900, Tanyard was an established post village.

Geography
Tanyard is located one mile south of Dover Bridge, which crosses the Choptank River and crossroad with Frazier Neck Road.

References

Unincorporated communities in Caroline County, Maryland
Unincorporated communities in Maryland